Ottilie Sutro (4 January 1872 – 12 September 1970) was an American concert pianist.  Ottilie  and her sister Rose Laura Sutro (1870 – 1957), popularly known as “Sutro sisters” were “a well­ known duo piano team.”

Biography
Ottilie Sutro  was born on 4 January 1872 in Baltimore.  Her father Ottu Sutro was a musician. Sutro sisters studied piano from Heinrich Barth at the Berlin Musikhochschule. In 1894 they successfully made their first appearance in London. On their return to America, they had their first concert with Anton Seidl  at the New York Philharmonic Orchestra.

Sutro sisters, Hinson claims, were “an outstanding two-piano team.”

Ottilie died on 12 September 1970 in Baltimore.

See also 
Rose and Ottilie Sutro

References

1872 births
1970 deaths
19th-century American pianists
19th-century American women pianists
20th-century American pianists
20th-century American women pianists
Musicians from Baltimore